Doris Mary Kermack FLS (née Carr; 1923 – 2003) was a British paleontologist and marine zoologist at Imperial College London. She completed her PhD thesis entitled 'The anatomy and physiology of the gut of Arenicola marina L.' at University College London in 1953. In 1988 she was awarded the Linnean Gold Medal for outstanding service to the society. She had two sons with her husband and fellow paleontologist Kenneth Kermack.

The species name Bridetherium dorisae is named in her honour.

Together with her husband and Frances Mussett she was the first to formally describe the early mammal-like 'symmetrodont' Kuehneotherium praecursoris.

References

Women paleontologists
British palaeontologists
Fellows of the Linnean Society of London
1923 births
2003 deaths
20th-century British women scientists